The Fairhaven Advocate is a community newspaper serving the communities of Acushnet, Massachusetts and Fairhaven, Massachusetts, United States. Introduced in 1979, it is now owned by local newspaper company Hathaway Publishing, which is owned by Local Media Group. Its current editor is Kaisa Holloway Cripps. Past editors include Michael Medeiros.

History 
In 1979, Gil Vieira first began publishing The Advocate, a weekly newspaper dedicated to the interests of Fairhaven. In the quarter century that has passed since the newspaper first hit stands, the publication has grown to cover the town of Acushnet as well. Since the late 1990s The Advocate has been printed by Hathaway Publishing, now a division of South Coast Media Group.

Editors and contributors

Current 
The current editor is Kaisa Holloway Cripps. Editorial contributors include Rich Damaso, Diane Westgate, Mali Lim, Elizabeth Morse Read and Sheri Tripanier. Photo contributors include Ed Pepin, Frank Rezendes and Charles Ferreira, Jr. The sports editor is Jon Haglof.

Past 
Past editors include Michael C. Medeiros and Lori Rebello (Richard).

Affiliates 
The Standard Times New Bedford
The Somerset Spectator
The Dartmouth/Westport Chronicle
The Fall River Spirit
The Middleboro Gazette

External links
The Advocate

1979 establishments in Massachusetts
Newspapers published in Massachusetts
Ottaway Community Newspapers
Newspapers established in 1979